Larry Travis Chester (born October 17, 1975) is a former American football defensive tackle who played in the National Football League (NFL).

After playing college football at Temple, Chester signed with the Indianapolis Colts as an undrafted free agent in 1998, and stayed with the Colts organization until 2000. He was picked up by Carolina Panthers for a season, then played with the Miami Dolphins for another three seasons.

References

1975 births
Living people
American football defensive tackles
Southwest Mississippi Bears football players
Temple Owls football players
Indianapolis Colts players
Carolina Panthers players
Miami Dolphins players